The following is a list of the sounds and inlets or similar features which punctuate the coast of Fiordland, in southwestern New Zealand, in geographic order from north to south:

Big Bay
Martins Bay
Milford Sound
Poison Bay
Sutherland Sound
Hāwea / Bligh Sound
Bounty Haven
George Sound
South West Arm
Looking Glass Bay
Caswell Sound
Charles Sound
Emelius Arm
Hinenui / Nancy Sound
Foot Arm
Thompson Sound
Bradshaw Sound (also Doubtful Sound)
Precipice Cove
Gaer Arm
Doubtful Sound / Patea, and its arms:
Malaspina Reach
Hall Arm
Crooked Arm
First Arm
Dagg Sound
Anchorage Arm
Breaksea Sound, and its arms:
Vancouver Arm
Broughton Arm
Acheron Passage (linked to Dusky Sound)
Wet Jacket Arm
Tamatea / Dusky Sound
Supper Cove
Fanny Bay
Cascade Cove
Taiari / Chalky Inlet, and its arms:
Moana-whenua-pōuri / Edwardson Sound
Te Korowhakaunu / Kanáris Sound
Rakituma / Preservation Inlet, and its arms:
Isthmus Sound
Useless Bay
Te Awaroa / Long Sound
Lake Hakapoua (divided from sea by a landslide in 1915)

Many of the sounds and inlets were given dual names in 2019.

References

 List
Fiordland